The line-up of Hyundai-Kia Y platforms is a list of platforms used by Hyundai Kia Automotive Group for its mid-size cars. It is succeeded by Hyundai-Kia N platforms.

Hyundai Y2
 Hyundai Sonata Y2 (1988–1993)
 Hyundai Grandeur L (1986–1992)
 Hyundai Santamo (1991–1998)
 Kia Joice (1999–2002)

Hyundai Y3
 Hyundai Sonata/Marcia (Y3) (1993–1999)
 Hyundai Grandeur LX (1992–1998)
 Hyundai Dynasty (1997–2005)
 Hyundai Santamo (1991–1998)
 Kia Joice (1999–2002)

Hyundai-Kia Y4
 Hyundai Sonata (EF) (1999–2005)
 Kia Optima (MS) / Magentis (2000–2005)
 Hyundai Grandeur/XG (XG) (1998–2005)
 Hyundai Dynasty (1997–2005)
 Kia Opirus (2003–2010)
 Hyundai Santa Fe (SM) (2000–2006)
 Hyundai Trajet (FO) (1999–2008)
 Kia Carens (1999–2006)

Hyundai-Kia Y5
 Hyundai Sonata (NF) (2004–2010)
 Kia Optima II (MG) / Magentis / Lotze (2005–2010, hybrid between J3 and Y5 platforms)
 Hyundai Grandeur IV (TG) / Azera (2005–2011)
 Kia Opirus (2005–2010)
 Hyundai Santa Fe II (CM) (2006–2012)
 Hyundai Veracruz / ix55 (EN) (2008–2012)
 Kia Sorento II (XM) (2009–2012)
 Kia Carnival II (VQ) / Sedona (2006–2014)
 Kia Carens II (UN) / Rondo (2006–2012, hybrid between J3 and Y5 platforms)

Hyundai-Kia Y6 
 Hyundai i40 (VF) (2011–2019, hybrid between J5 and Y6 platforms)
 Hyundai Mistra (CF) (2013–2020, hybrid between J5 and Y6 platforms)
 Hyundai Sonata/i45 (YF) (2009–2014)
 Kia Optima/K5 (TF) (2011–2015)
 Kia K4 (2014-)
 Hyundai Aslan (AG) (2014–2017)
 Hyundai Grandeur/Azera (HG) (2011–2017)
 Kia K7/Cadenza (VG) (2009–2016)
 Hyundai Santa Fe/Santa Fe Sport (DM) (2012–2018)
 Hyundai Maxcruz/Santa Fe/Grand Santa Fe/Santa Fe XL (NC) (2012–2019)
 Kia Sorento (XM) (2012–2015)
 Kia Carnival/Sedona (YP) (2014–2020)
 Kia Carens (RP) (2013–2020)

Hyundai-Kia Y7 
 Hyundai Sonata (LF) (2014–2019)
 Kia Optima/K5 (JF) (2015–2020)
 Hyundai Lafesta (2018–)
 Hyundai Grandeur/Azera (IG) (2016–present)
 Kia K7/Cadenza (YG) (2016–2021)
 Hyundai Santa Fe (TM) (pre-facelift, 2018–2020)
 Kia Sorento (UM) (2015–2020)

References 

Y platforms